The Aurá River is located in Maranhão, northeastern Brazil.

See also
List of rivers of Maranhão

References
Brazilian Ministry of Transport

Rivers of Maranhão